Leonrod may refer to:

 Leonrod (Dietenhofen), a hamlet in the municipality of Dietenhofen
 Leonrod Castle, a ruined castle in the above parish
 House of Leonrod, a German noble family

Leonrod is also the name of the following people:
 Wilhelm von Leonrod, cathedral canon and deacon of Eichstätt
 Sigmund von Leonrod, canon of Eichstätt
 Franz Leopold Freiherr von Leonrod (1827–1905), Bishop of Eichstätt
 Leopold von Leonrod (1829–1905), Bavarian minister of justice
 Ludwig Freiherr von Leonrod (1906–1944), German officer and resistance fighter
 Sybilla von Leonrod, née Meilhaus (1814–1881), governess to King Ludwig II of Bavaria